The Sign of the Takahe is a neo-Gothic style historic building in Christchurch, New Zealand. It is currently leased from Christchurch City Council and run as a cafe, bar, and function centre.

History 
Construction began on the building in 1918, spearheaded by Christchurch City councillor and New Zealand Member of Parliament, Henry George (Harry) Ell. Ell envisioned the building as the entrance rest house of Summit Road, one of four planned rest houses in the area for those walking the reserves of Port Hills that overlook Christchurch and Lyttelton harbour. The other rest houses are Sign of the Kiwi, Sign of the Bellbird, and Sign of the Packhorse.

While part of the building opened to the public as the Tram Terminus Rest House in 1920, which featured a tram terminus and tearoom, it would take decades for construction of the Sign of the Takahe to be completed.

Ell died suddenly in 1934, having never seen the building completed. Construction of the building continued under the direction of architect J. G. Collins. The Christchurch City Council bought the building in 1942 and it was finally completed in 1948.

Like many structures in the area, the building was damaged in the February 2011 Canterbury earthquake. A NZ$2.8 million council restoration was completed prior to the building's centennial in May 2017.

Notable features 
The building is named after the endemic New Zealand flightless bird, the Takahē.

During the Great Depression, a great deal of improvisation was required to minimise cost. For example, the stone was quarried locally and hand chiseled into blocks using primitive tools, the heavy Kauri beams in the entrance hall were salvaged from a former bridge over the Hurunui River. The ceilings in the inner-most dining room were painted on timber cut from packing cases.

The building's dining room fireplace is an exact replica of the historic Haddon Hall in Derbyshire.

The building has a Category I listing with Heritage New Zealand. It is located adjacent to Cracroft Reserve.

References

 Harry Ell and His Summit Road : a Biography of Henry George Ell by Lenore Oakley, published by Caxton Press 1960

Buildings and structures in Christchurch
Tourist attractions in Christchurch
Heritage New Zealand Category 1 historic places in Canterbury, New Zealand
1940s architecture in New Zealand
Gothic Revival architecture in New Zealand